Michael Kahikina (born January 16, 1950) is an American politician who served in the Hawaii House of Representatives from 1995 to 2007.

References

1950 births
Living people
Democratic Party members of the Hawaii House of Representatives